Georges Perrot (12 November 1832 – 30 June 1914) was a French archaeologist.

He taught at the Sorbonne from 1875 and was director of the École Normale Supérieure from 1888 to 1902. In 1874 he was elected to the Academie des Inscriptions et Belles-Lettres, where he served as the permanent secretary from 1904 until his death.

After discovering in 1857 a first fragment of the Gortyn code, his most famous archaeological discovery was made while on an expedition to Asia Minor in 1861, where he found a Greek translation of the document known as 'The Political Testament of the Emperor Augustus'. Perrot edited and contributed to the journal Revue archéologique. His works include the two accounts of his expedition to Asia Minor (published 1862 and 1864), and the ten-volume Histoire de l'art dans l'antiquité, which he wrote with Charles Chipiez (1882–1914).

Works
 (reprinted 1872, vols. 1–2)

 (reprinted 1869)

 
Vol. 1 (1882): L'Égypte
Vol. 2 (1884): Chaldée et Assyrie
Vol. 3 (1885): Phénicie, Cypre
Vol. 4 (1887): Judée. Sardaigne, Syrie, Cappadoce
Vol. 5 (1890): Perse. Phrygie, Lydie et Carie, Lycie
Vol. 6 (1894): La Grèce primitive. L'art mycénien
Vol. 7 (1898): La Grèce de l'épopée. La Grèce archaïque (le temple)
Vol. 8 (1903): La Grèce archaïque. La sculpture
Vol. 9 (1911): La Grèce archai͏̈que. La glyptique, la numismatique, la peinture, la céramique
Vol. 10 (1914): La Grèce archai͏̈que. La céramique d'Athènes

References
'Death of M.G. Perrot', The Times, 1 July 1914
'Noted archaeologist dies', The New York Times, 1 July 1914

External links
 
 

1832 births
1914 deaths
People from Villeneuve-Saint-Georges
French archaeologists
French art historians
French hellenists
École Normale Supérieure alumni
Members of the Académie des Inscriptions et Belles-Lettres
Corresponding Fellows of the British Academy
Travelers in Asia Minor